Bobby Doyle may refer to:

 Bobby Doyle (Scottish footballer) (1953–2019), former professional association footballer
 Bobby Doyle (Gaelic footballer), former Gaelic football player for Dublin
 Bobby Doyle (jazz vocalist) (1939–2006), jazz singer from Houston, Texas, who toured with Kenny Rogers

See also
Robert Doyle (disambiguation)
Bob Doyle (disambiguation)